Full Circle is a compilation studio album by American hard rock band, FireHouse. The album features re-recorded material from the band's previous releases. It features all original members excluding bassist Perry Richardson, and replacing him with ex-Jani Lane bassist Allen McKenzie, thus making the album the first to feature McKenzie on bass. It consists of 5 tracks from their debut, FireHouse, 3 tracks from their sophomore effort, Hold Your Fire 1 track from their 3rd release aptly titled, 3, 1 track from their acoustic release, Good Acoustics, and 1 track from The Best of FireHouse compilation. The album spawned a tour covering the United States, Japan, Thailand, Indonesia, Puerto Rico, Brazil, Peru, Korea, Portugal, and India.

Track listing

Personnel 
 C. J. Snare - Vocals/keyboards/lyrical writing 
 Bill Leverty - Guitar/backing vocals/lyrical writing
 Allen McKenzie - Bass/backing vocals
 Michael Foster - Drums/backing vocals/Percussion/writing (on tracks 1, 2 and 6)
 Bill Leverty - Producer/Engineering
 Michael Caplain - Executive Producer
 Ellis - Lyrical writing (on tracks 1 and 6)

See also
FireHouse discography

References

External links

2011 albums
FireHouse (band) albums